Donald George MacGregor Findlay (August 24, 1942 – May 11, 2021) was a professional Canadian football linebacker who played 12 years in the Canadian Football League for the BC Lions from 1962 to 1973.

In 1971, while still an active player, Findlay became the third president of the Canadian Football League Players' Association.

Findlay died on May 11, 2021 in Langley, British Columbia.

References

1942 births
2021 deaths
BC Lions players
Canadian football linebackers
Players of Canadian football from Ontario
Sportspeople from Timmins